A circular letter is a written document that is addressed for circulation to a group of people. It is usually formal and official. It may be for a closed group or general distribution. The term may refer to:

 Flyer (pamphlet), a single page leaflet
 Newsletter, a report containing news about an organization that is sent to members, customers, employees, or others
 Circular Letter (Interlingua), an early Interlingua publication
 Circular letter or encyclical, a letter written by a bishop and addressed to his clergy
 Massachusetts Circular Letter, a statement written by Samuel Adams